Rico Barrera (born Frederick Barrera on December 29, 1984) is a Filipino actor, the first housemate evicted from the 12 housemates of Pinoy Big Brother on 2005.

Prior to entering the house, Barrera was a singer in Japan. He was the first housemate evicted, on his 21st day in Pinoy Big Brother's house. Among the violations that put him automatically into nomination were jumping into the pool while still wearing his lapel microphone and accidentally causing a pan to catch a flame, setting off the fire alarm.

After PPB, He became a flight steward and now a businessman. He became part of FrontRow International last 2012 and now belongs to Millionaires Club of FrontRow.

Barrera reportedly transferred to GMA 7 from ABS-CBN 2 last August 2009, due to his no projects of Kapamilya Network.  He has now launched his first Kapuso Network TV show, Sine Novela Presents: Tinik Sa Dibdib.  He was the second ex-PBB housemate transferred to GMA 7 after fellow ex-housemate Say Alonzo also transferred to GMA since 2008. But he returned to Kapamilya Network in 2010 and he is one of the cast of Magkano Ang Iyong Dangal?.

Filmography
Movies
Huwag Kang Lalabas: Hotel Episode (2021)
Alfredo S. Lim: The Untold Stories (2013)
Si Agimat, si Enteng Kabisote at si Ako (2012)
Dukot (2009)
Walang Hanggang Paalam (2009)
Lalamunan (2008)
Paano Kita Iibigin (2007)
Pacquiao: The Movie (2006)

Television
Apoy Sa Dagat (2013)
Nasaan Ka Elisa? (2011)
Bantatay (2010–2011)
Maynila (2010)
Magkano Ang Iyong Dangal? (2010)
Ikaw Sana (2009)
Sine Novela: Tinik Sa Dibdib (2009)
Kahit Isang Saglit (2008)
Pinoy Mano Mano: Celebrity Boxing Challenge (2007)
Rounin (2007)
Love Spell Presents: Wanted: Mr. Perfect (2006)
Komiks: Inday bote (2006)
Gulong ng Palad (2006)
ASAP Fanatic (2006)
Pinoy Big Brother (2005)

References

1981 births
Living people
People from Olongapo
Pinoy Big Brother contestants
Star Magic
Filipino male television actors
Filipino male models
Male actors from Zambales